Taking Lives is the debut album of the American hip-hop duo Something Awful, which consists of rapper Fury (born Jay Flores) and Detroit-based emcee Bizarre (born Rufus Johnson). Fellow Bizarre's bandmates from D12 (Kuniva and Swifty McVay) and L.A.R.S. (King Gordy) made guest appearances on the record, as well as Fury's Mattrix, White Out and Bloody-T from Lethal Wreckords, among other performers such as Bizzy Bone, Brotha Lynch Hung and Twisted Insane. This album is also volume 47 of Underground Hustlin series because of cypher.

Track listing

†Song "Taking Lives" contains guitars by Dos The Boss
†Song "The Cypher" contains uncredited raps by B Reign, Ether, Kuniva, Mattrix, Freeze, Swifty McVay, Top Prospect, Whiteout
†Song "I Can Do Anything" contains uncredited vocals by Lexxi
†Song "Taking Lives Cypher (Bonus Track)" appears as a 19:05 duration track only in physical version of the album and consists of rap verses by Bizarre, Fury, Intrinzik, Trikkd Out, Chuck E Lee, C DANGER, Insane LOC, KZK, Mr. Grey, JD, D CrazE, Kingfiend & Sixthree, Heaven, SNAP, Dead Body Kingz, Thic Man, Psyco Sick Asylum, Doze, YDMC, Crisus, Jonny Wierdo, Masta, MC Gan, 2 Much

Personnel
 McNastee - design and layout

References

External links

2013 debut albums
Bizarre (rapper) albums
Underground hip hop albums